Triticum carthlicum Nevski, 1934, the Persian wheat, is a tetraploid wheat.

Some scholars refer to it as Triticum turgidum subspecies carthlicum.. Recent research suggest that T. Carthlicum originated from a cross between domesticated emmer wheat and T. aestivum.

References

Bibliography

Wheat